Four Mothers is a 1941 American drama film and sequel to Four Daughters (1938) and Four Wives (1939). The film stars Claude Rains, Jeffrey Lynn, May Robson and featuring the Lane Sisters: Priscilla Lane, Rosemary Lane and Lola Lane. It was directed by William Keighley and is based on the story "Sister Act" by Fannie Hurst. The film was released by Warner Bros. on January 4, 1941. The Lane sisters appeared in all three films and also appeared together in the 1939 film Daughters Courageous.

Plot
In this final installment of Warner Brothers' Four Daughters series, the entire Lemp family loses its investment in son-in-law Ben Crowley's (Frank McHugh) out-of-state realty project when a hurricane destroys the development site. So Ben suggests they localize and develop their own property to sell, but no one in town will help finance the venture after the hurricane debacle. So in order to get their hands on some much-needed cash, the Lemp family patriarch, Adam (Claude Rains), sells the house in which he raised his daughters. To his shock, however, he learns the person who bought it is planning to raze the old structure to make way for an apartment building.

To do his part in bringing in more dollars for the family, son-in-law Felix (Jeffery Lynn) travels to Chicago for a job conducting an orchestra. Meanwhile, Kay (Rosemary Lane), the only Lemp daughter who is childless, is upset that husband Clint (Eddie Albert) spends more time at work than with her at home. Things get worse after his lab research leads him closer to the cause of Pneumoconiosis at the town's smelting plant. Eventually, Kay has had it. She too leaves for Chicago—to seek a job in radio. But for both Felix and Kay, the big city proves to hold no suitable alternative to either their financial or family woes. So they both return home.

After moving into an apartment with his sister Etta (May Robson), Adam is invited to conduct for the Beethoven Music Festival at the Hollywood Bowl in Los Angeles. The whole family travels there to proudly watch him. They then return home for the opening of Lemp Acres, the new property Ben has started and developed for the family. Upon Adam's arrival, he finds he has regained the respect of the town—so much so that the townspeople financed the moving of his old house to Lemp Acres, and all is the same as it once was. In the end, as the four daughters hold one of their musical practice sessions, Kay realizes she is finally pregnant.

Cast

References

External links

1941 films
1941 drama films
American black-and-white films
American drama films
American sequel films
1940s English-language films
Films about families
Films directed by William Keighley
Warner Bros. films
Films scored by Heinz Roemheld
Films based on works by Fannie Hurst
1940s American films